Joseph Francis Donnelly (May 1, 1909 – June 30, 1977) was a bishop of the Catholic Church in the United States. He served as Auxiliary Bishop of the Archdiocese of Hartford from 1965 to 1977.

Biography
Born in Norwich, Connecticut, Donnelly was ordained a priest on June 29, 1934, for the Diocese of Hartford. On November 9, 1964 Pope Paul VI appointed him as the Titular Bishop of Nabala and Auxiliary Bishop of Hartford.  He was consecrated a bishop by Henry O'Brien, Archbishop of Hartford, on January 28, 1965. The principal co-consecrators were Vincent Hines, Bishop of Norwich, and John Hackett, Auxiliary Bishop of Hartford.  Donnelly was an ardent supporter of farm laborers and served as the Chairman of the Bishop's Committee on Farm Labor.  He also spent 20 years on the Connecticut Board of Mediation and Arbitration with fifteen of those years as its chairman.  He served as Hartford's auxiliary bishop until his death on June 30, 1977, at the age of 68.

References

External links
Roman Catholic Archdiocese of Hartford

1909 births
1977 deaths
Religious leaders from Norwich, Connecticut
20th-century American Roman Catholic titular bishops
Roman Catholic auxiliary bishops of Hartford
Catholics from Connecticut